Persephonella guaymasensis is a thermophilic, hydrogen-oxidizing microaerophile first isolated from a deep-sea hydrothermal vent. It is strictly chemolithoautotrophic, microaerophilic, motile, 2-4 micrometres in size, rod-shaped, Gram-negative and non-sporulating. Its type strain is EX-H2T.

References

Further reading
Tokano, Tetsuya, ed. Water on Mars and life. Vol. 4. Springer, 2005.
D'Imperio, Seth. Microbial Interactions with Arsenite, Hydrogen and Sulfide in an Acid-sulfate-chloride Geothermal Spring. ProQuest, 2008.

External links
LPSN
WORMS

Aquificota
Bacteria described in 2002